Performance by an Comic Actor is one of the Hum Awards of Merit presented annually by the Hum Television Network and Entertainment Channel (HTNEC) to recognize a comic actor who has delivered an outstanding performance while working within the Television industry. Since its inception, however, the award has commonly been referred to as the hum for Best comic Actor. While actors are nominated for this award by Hum members who are actors and actresses themselves, winners are selected by the Hum membership as a whole.

History
Hum Television Network and Entertainment Channel presented this award to one of the finest actors of Pakistani TV industry, as of first ceremony total of four actors were nominated and currently Uroosa Siddiqui was honored at 1st Hum Awards ceremony 2012 for his performance in Fun Khana.

Category

As of first ceremony Best Comic Actor, preserve and awarded in solo category for both Male and Female actors, Among them winner was concluded.

Winners and nominees
In the list below, winners are listed first in the colored row, followed by the other nominees.

For the first ceremony, the eligibility period spanned full calendar years. For example, the 1st Hum Awards presented on April 28, 2013, to recognized comic actors of sitcoms that were released between January, 2012, and December, 2012, the period of eligibility is the full previous calendar year from January 1 to December 31.

Date and the award ceremony shows that the 2010 is the period from 2010-2020 (10 years-decade), while the year above winners and nominees shows that the dramas year in which they were telecast, and the figure in bracket shows the ceremony number, for example; an award ceremony is held for the dramas of its previous year.

2010s

See also 
 Hum Awards
 Hum Awards pre-show
 List of Hum Awards Ceremonies

References

External links
Official websites
 Hum Awards official website
 Hum Television Network and Entertainment Channel (HTNEC)
 Hum's Channel at YouTube (run by the Hum Television Network and Entertainment Channel)
 Hum Awards at Facebook (run by the Hum Television Network and Entertainment Channel)

Hum Awards
Hum Award winners
Hum TV
Hum Network Limited